The Limerick Intermediate Hurling Championship is an annual hurling competition organised by the Limerick County Board of the Gaelic Athletic Association for the third tier hurling teams in the county of Limerick in Ireland.

The series of games are played during the summer and autumn months with the county final currently being played at the Gaelic Grounds in October. The championship includes a group stage which is followed by a knock-out phase for the top teams. There is also promotion involving the Limerick Premier Intermediate Hurling Championship.

The Intermediate Championship is an integral part of the wider Munster Junior Club Hurling Championship. The winners of the Limerick county final join the champions of the other hurling counties to contest the provincial championship.

Twelve clubs currently participate in the Premier Intermediate Championship.

History

The original intermediate championship dates back to 1910. It was the third hurling championship to be established in Limerick, and was seen as a stepping stone between the senior and junior hurling championships. Three separate hurling championships proved difficult to sustain, particularly due to a lack of competitive clubs, and the newly formed intermediate championship was not staged in 1913 before being suspended in 1915.

In 1928 an effort was once again made to revive the intermediate grade, however, after just two completed seasons the grade was once again suspended in 1930 in favour of a two-tier senior and junior championship.

After an absence of nearly half a century the intermediate championship was reorganised again in 1975, however, it survived only three seasons before being abolished for the third time in its history.

By 1988 the gap between the senior and junior grades proved too great and the intermediate championship was introduced once again. It has remained a staple of the hurling calendar since then, however, it has undergone some major changes. Originally played as a straight knock-out championship, the competition was eventually expanded to feature a group stage which provided more games.

In 2013 the intermediate championship was relegated to being the third most important championship in Limerick as a new premier intermediate grade was established. Because of this the number of participating clubs was reduced from sixteen to twelve.

Top winners

Recent finals

See also

 Limerick Senior Hurling Championship
 Limerick Premier Intermediate Hurling Championship

External links
 Limerick Club Winners
 2014 Limerick Intermediate Hurling Championship Group 1
 2014 Limerick Intermediate Hurling Championship Group 2

References

Hurling competitions in County Limerick
Intermediate hurling county championships